Karan-e Bozorg may refer to:
 Karan-e Bozorg, Khalkhal
 Karan-e Bozorg, Nir